Holger Gustafsson (born 1946) is a Swedish Christian Democratic politician, member of the Riksdag since 1991.

He finished training as a Construction engineer in 1970 and earned a degree in business administration with a major in marketing in 1973.

Current posts
Member, the Parliament of Sweden
Member, the Swedish Parliament Committee on Foreign Affairs 
Member, the Swedish Parliament Committee on Finance 
Delegate, the Inter-Parliamentary Union
Swedish International Development Cooperation Agency, Sida
Member of the board and the executive committee of the Christian Democratic Party Skaraborg County section

Previous posts
Member of the European Parliament
Member of the Swedish Parliament Committee on Taxation 
Member of the Swedish Organization for Security and Co-operation in Europe delegation 
Deputy Chairman of the Swedish Parliament Committee on Civil Law
Member of Swedish Parliament EEA Committee and the EC delegation 
Member of the Swedish Parliament Committee on the Environment and Agriculture 
The Speakers' Conference (Talmanskonferensen)
Chairman of the Swedish Post and Telecom Authority
The Commission on the Courts 
The Reference Group for Swedish Agriculture 
The Municipal Council and the Education Board 
The County Council Executive Committee 
Skaraborg County Administrative Board 
The Federation of Swedish Industries’ Committee on the Business Sector 
Christian Democratic Party Executive, and the board of the parliamentary party 
Chairman of the Christian Democrats in Skaraborg County 
The Christian Democratic Party's EU group 
Skaraborg County Council 
Skaraborg County Council Hospital Board
Västra Götaland County Administrative Board 
The Council of Europe for Human Rights
Christian Democrats party group in Skaraborg County Council 
Västra Götaland Regional Development Board 
Gothenburg Tax Authority, board member 
Chairman of the Christian Democratic Party's regional executive committee in Västra Götaland

References

External links 
 Official website
 Gustafsson's profile at the Swedish parliament

Living people
1946 births
Members of the Riksdag 1991–1994
Members of the Riksdag 1994–1998
Members of the Riksdag 1998–2002
Members of the Riksdag 2002–2006
Members of the Riksdag 2006–2010
Members of the Riksdag from the Christian Democrats (Sweden)